Shihoko Ishii (born 1950) is a Japanese mathematician and professor at the University of Tokyo.  Her research area is algebraic geometry.

Education

Ishii received her bachelor's degree from Tokyo Women's Christian University in 1973 and her master's degree from Waseda University in 1975.  She earned her PhD from Tokyo Metropolitan University in 1983.

Research

Ishii's research focuses on singularity theory.  She studies arc spaces, a mathematical concept related to jets: arc spaces are varieties encapsulating information about curves on another variety.

Awards and honours

Ishii received the Saruhashi Prize for accomplishments by a Japanese woman researcher in the natural sciences in 1995.  As a postdoc, Ishii was inspired by reading a profile of Fumiko Yonezawa, a physicist and former winner of the Saruhashi prize.

Ishii received the Algebra Prize from the Mathematical Society of Japan in 2011.

References

Algebraic geometers
Japanese mathematicians
Women mathematicians
Living people
1950 births